Stephen Vaughan may refer to:

Stephen Vaughan Jr. (born 1985), footballer, turned manager
Stephen Vaughan Sr. (born c. 1962), English businessman from Liverpool
Stephen Vaughan (merchant) (died 1549), English merchant, royal agent and diplomat
 Stevie Ray Vaughan (1954–1990), American guitarist

See also
John Stephen Vaughan (1853–1925), Roman Catholic bishop
Stephen Vaughn (fl. 2010s), American attorney and bureaucrat